The Taipei Financial Center Corporation is a Taiwanese company notable for its ownership of Taipei 101.

Lendlease was the company's retail consultant in 2003. Ting Hsin International Group was its biggest shareholder, with a 37% stake, in 2010. In 2014, Ting Hsin International Group said it would sell its Taipei Financial Center Corporation shares to raise cash for around $770 million. Sometime around 2018 ITOCHU purchased 37% of Taipei Financial Center Corporation, which it spent USD$670 million on.

The other largest shareholders are Chunghwa Telecom, Taiwan Stock Exchange, Mega Financial Holding, and CTBC Financial Holding.

See also
 List of companies of Taiwan

References

Multinational companies
Companies based in Taipei
Financial services companies established in 1997
Taiwanese companies established in 1997